Astragalus coelestis, the celestial milkvetch, is a species of milkvetch that is endemic to Armenia, and is known from Mount Bug-Dag in the Sevan area. It can be found on herbaceous slopes at about 2,200 m elevation. It is threatened by agricultural expansion and nomadic livestock farming.

References

coelestis
Endemic flora of Armenia